The Comoros thrush (Turdus bewsheri) is a species of bird in the family Turdidae. It is found in the Comoros Islands in the south western Indian Ocean.

Description
The Comoros thrush is a brown bird with olive tinged upperparts, slightly more rufous on the tail and wings. The underparts are whitish except for brown flanks and brown scaling on the breast and belly, central belly and undertail coverts are white. The females are browner than the males but otherwise similar, juveniles are more rufous. The length is 24 cm.

Voice
The song is a typically thrush-like series of melodious, rich notes which varies between islands. ALarm call is a sharp "twit" and there is a soft contact call.

Distribution and subspecies
There are three recognised subspecies, each endemic to a single island. They are:

Turdis bewsheri comorensis Milne-Edwards & Oustalet, 1885: Grand Comoro. 
Turdis bewsheri moheliensis Benson, 1960: Mohéli. 
Turdis bewsheri bewsheri E. Newton, 1877: Anjouan.

Habitat
Comoro thrush occurs in evergreen primary forest and forest edge from sea level to 700m, except for the subspecies T.B. comorensis which occurs on Mount Karthala above this altitude as no forests exist lower than this.

Habits
The Comoro thrush normally forages low down in the understorey or on the ground, looking fore spiders, grasshoppers, bugs, molluscs and some fruit and seeds. Will go higher into the canopy to feed on fruit. Sometimes joins mixed species flocks. It breeds in mid-August to October when a cup shaped nest is built from plant fibres and roots, covered in moss and lined with fine grasses. It is placed up to 3m from the ground on a tree stump, among epiphytes or along a horizontal branch. the normal clutch is 2 eggs.

Conservation
The Comoro thrush is classified as Near threatened by the IUCN and the main threat is habitat loss through forest degradation due to clearance by subsistence farmers and firewood cutting.

References

External links
 recordings at Xeno-Canto

Comoros thrush
Endemic birds of the Comoros
Comoros thrush
Taxa named by Edward Newton
Taxonomy articles created by Polbot